A rotating savings and credit association (ROSCA) is a group of individuals who agree to meet for a defined period in order to save and borrow together, a form of combined peer-to-peer banking and peer-to-peer lending.

The first academic description of ROSCAs was by Shirley Ardener in 1964. F. J. A. Bouman described ROSCAs as "the poor man's bank, where money is not idle for long but changes hands rapidly, satisfying both consumption and production needs." They are also known as tandas in Latin America, chama in Swahili-speaking East Africa, kameti (کمیٹی) in Pakistan, visi among Gujaratis in India, ekub in Ethiopia, partnerhand in the West Indies, cundinas in Mexico, hagbad in Somalia, stokvel in South Africa, susu in West Africa and the Caribbean, hui in Chinese communities in East and Southeast Asia, hội/hụi in Vietnam, paluwagan in the Philippines, gam'eya (جمعية) in Egypt, gye in South Korea, tanomoshiko in Japan, chit fund in India, pandeiros in Brazil, cuchubál in Guatemala, juntas, quiniela or panderos in Peru, C.A.R. Țigănesc/Roata in Romania, arisan in Indonesia, lenshare (เล่นแชร์) in Thailand, dhukuti or dhikuti in Nepal, gün in Turkey, and menage''' or menodge in Scotland.

Structure
Meetings can be regular or tied to seasonal cash flow cycles in rural communities. These usually coincide with the crop harvest for farmers and pay dates for the employed members where people have sure funds on hand. A slot is equivalent to one periodic money withdrawal. To determine the order of money distribution among members, a drawing of slot is done and agreed prior to the start of periodic fund accumulation. Depending on the intended purpose, a member can swap his slot with another through mutual agreement. Such switching of slots is allowed prior to the fund accumulation or before the periodic money withdrawal. A member who availed more than one slot may have the reserved right to choose the other slot pay date. Nevertheless, the organizer should be informed of the changes prior to the pay process to avoid confusion. Each member contributes the same amount at each meeting, and one member takes the whole sum once. As a result, each member is able to access a larger sum of money during the life of the ROSCA, and use it for whatever purpose she or he wishes. This method of saving is a popular alternative to the risks of saving at home, where family and relatives may demand access to savings.

Every transaction is seen by every member during the meetings. Since no money has to be retained inside the group, no records have to be kept. Though some maintain a crude list of slots. These characteristics make the system a model of transparency and simplicity that is well adapted to communities with low levels of literacy and weak systems for protecting collective property rights.

The system further reduces the risk to members because it is time limited—typically lasting no more than six months. Each member receives at least once the amount collected. This reduces the size of the loss, should someone take funds early and not pay back.

In addition to their simplicity of structure, ROSCAs compensate when two key conditions exist, which make them competitive alternative financial products, even in relatively sophisticated economies:
 Erosion of buying power of accumulated savings over long savings horizons in inflationary conditions
 Failure of the normal financing market to provide credit to credit worthy borrowers, often due to opportunity cost, regulation, or operational expense

Diversity and distribution
Variously called "committee" in India and Pakistan, Equb in Ethiopia, Susus in Western Africa and the Caribbean, "Seettuva" in Sri Lanka, tontines in West Africa, tanomoshiko or mujin in pre-1945 Japan, wichin gye in Korea, arisan in Indonesia, likelembas in the Democratic Republic of the Congo, xitique in Mozambique and djanggis in Cameroon, ROSCAs are informal or 'pre-co-operative' microfinance groups that have been documented around the developing world. A famous early study by anthropologist Clifford Geertz documented the arisans of Modjokuto in Eastern Java. He described them as "an 'intermediate' institution growing up within peasant social structure, to harmonize agrarian economic patterns with commercial ones, to act as a bridge between peasant and trader attitudes toward money and its uses."

The individuals in the ROSCA select each other, which ensures that participation is based on trust and social forces (social capital), and a genuine commitment to participate. In Brazilian consorcios, groups of strangers are assembled into a ROSCA unit by an agent or intermediary, whose role in facilitating the group formation and on-going administration is remunerated. As at 2015, over five million active ROSCA users were reported in Brazil. As the consorcio runs its term, many of the same features of social capital and compliance manifest, as members of the group develop personal contact and trust.

Types
ROSCAs can be compared and contrasted with accumulating savings and credit associations (ASCAs). Documented extensively in South Asia by Rutherford, ASCAs are also time-limited, informal microfinance groups. Unlike ROSCAs however, they appoint one of their members to manage an internal fund. Records are kept and surplus lent out. After a pre-agreed period (often 6–12 months) all the loans are called back and the fund, plus accumulated profit, is distributed to the members.

International development practitioners have been intrigued for years by the potential benefits of attempting to link ROSCAs and ASCAs to formal financial systems. But such linkages tend to defeat the voluntary purpose of these groups and distort member incentives towards securing access to external funds. CARE, an American NGO, has spread standardized ASCAs to reach 2 million people in Africa. These standardized ASCAs are called village savings and loan associations (VSLAs), and they usually comprise 10 to 20 participants who conduct saving and loan activities for a fixed period, usually 12 months. Unlike informal ASCAs, these use a triple-locked box to secure the funds, have standardized election procedures and maintain a careful separation of various duties, such as record-keeping, money-counting, meeting facilitation etc. Interest rates on loans typically vary from 5–10% a month, while cycle-end pay-outs in most groups is 30–60% of invested capital.

As of the end of June 2012 development agencies (including CARE, Oxfam, CRS and PLAN) were carrying out projects reaching 1.8 million members in 23 countries, mostly in Africa. The Savings Group Information Exchange, a project of the Bill and Melinda Gates Foundation, provides researchers with an on-line database where indicators like savings and loans per member, country, return on assets and percentage of female members can be compared.

Another interesting variant on this theme are the terminating deposits that formed part of product line of building societies in the last half of the nineteenth century. These provided many workers with the funds required to finance their own homes.

Online ROSCAs
Carlos Veléz-Ibáñez, an anthropology professor at Arizona State University, stated that "technology has added a new twist to the savings pools, with 'electronic cundinas[ROSCAs]' being organized on Web sites that can bring together people from across the United States". A few of the existing products include eMoneyPool, created by two brothers living in Phoenix, Arizona; Monk, founded by ex-Google and ex-Intel employees in Silicon Valley; Puddle, a Google-venture backed startups, Moneyfellows UK & African based online mobile and web platform digitizing the ROSCA model; ROSCA Finance, a patent pending startup creating a global, autonomous money sharing platform founded by former Santander bankers; Esusu, founded by ex-Goldman Sachs, PwC and LinkedIn employees in New York and Partnerhand, a patent pending UK based organisation facilitating online 'Pardner's' between verified individuals, founded in 2010.

StepLadder, founded in 2016 by finance professionals with distinguished academic work on Consorcios in Brazil is joining the UK market for ROSCA-based collaborative finance by serving prospective first-time UK home buyers. In October 2017 Finlok platform launched a digital ROSCA product in India leveraging NPCI's Unified Payment Interface.

Aturi Africa has automated and digitized Chama financial services with a goal of offering these services to millions of people in Africa and around the world. The FinTech StartUp is founded by ex-Safaricom employee from Kenya and it launched in late 2020.

A more complete version of a savings club for buying vehicles launched in the United States on 2022. savings.club enables users to join clubs administrated by the company and leverages on credit card payments and rates much lower than traditional auto loans.

See also
 Bond of association
 Chit fund
 Collaborative finance
 Friendly society
 Microcredit
 Solidarity lending

References

Bibliography
Ardener, Shirley and Sandra Burman. "Money-Go-Rounds: The Importance of Rotating Savings and Credit Associations for Women". Oxford: Berg, 1995.
Arnaldo, Mauri, "Economia sommersa, finanza informale e microcredito nei paesi emergenti", A: Mauri & C. Conti (eds.), Finanza informale, finanza etica e finanza internazionale nelle piccole e medie imprese, Milano 2000.
Besley, Timothy, Stephen Coate, and Glenn Loury. "The economics of rotating savings and credit associations." The American Economic Review (1993): 792–810.
Geertz, Clifford. The Rotating Credit Association: a middle rung in development. Cambridge, Massachusetts, United States: Massachusetts Institute of Technology, Center for International Studies, 1956.
Grant, William J. & Hugh Allen. CARE's Mata Matsu Dubara (Women on the Move) Program in Niger. Journal of Microfinance, Brigham Young School of Business, Provo, Utah, Fall, 2002.
Rutherford, Stuart, The Poor and Their Money Oxford University Press, 2000.
van den Brink, Rogier and Jean-Paul Chavas, "The Microeconomics of an Indigenous African Institution: The Rotating Savings and Credit Association." Economic Development and Cultural Change, Volume 45, No. 4, July 1997.
Von Pischke, J. D., Dale W. Adams & Gordon Donald. Rural Financial Markets in Developing Countries''. EDI Series in Economic Development, World Bank, Washington, 1983.

 
Microfinance
Collaborative finance
Credit unions